Jody Jenneker (born 10 April 1984 in Durban, South Africa) is a rugby union player who played for the Sharks in the Super Rugby competition. He plays as a hooker. He now plays in France for Castres.

Jenkker was suspended for three weeks for striking Maxime Médard in their semi-final qualifier against Toulouse on May 18, 2018.

References

External links
Sharks profile

1984 births
Living people
South African rugby union players
Sharks (rugby union) players
Sharks (Currie Cup) players
Western Province (rugby union) players
Falcons (rugby union) players
Rugby union hookers
Rugby union players from Durban